Drei Klavierstücke (Three Piano Pieces) may refer to:

Arnold Schoenberg:
 Drei Klavierstücke (1894)
 Drei Klavierstücke (Schoenberg), Op. 11 (1909)
Franz Schubert:
Drei Klavierstücke D 459A, upon first publication appended to Piano Sonata in E major, D 459
Drei Klavierstücke D 946, a.k.a. Schubert's three last Impromptus (Schubert)